Bis(2-chloroethyl)sulfide is the organosulfur compound with the formula . It is a prominent member of a family of cytotoxic and blister agents known as mustard agents. Sometimes referred to as mustard gas, the term is technically incorrect: bis(2-chloroethyl)sulfide is a liquid at room temperature.  In warfare it was dispersed in the form of a fine mist of liquid droplets.

Synthesis
Bis(2-chloroethyl)sulfide has been prepared in a variety of variety of ways. In the Depretz method, sulfur dichloride is treated with ethylene:

In the Levinstein process, disulfur dichloride is used instead:
 +  S8

In the Meyer method, thiodiglycol is produced from chloroethanol and potassium sulfide, and the resulting diol is then treated with phosphorus trichloride:

In the Meyer–Clarke method, concentrated hydrochloric acid (HCl) is used instead of PCl3:

Thionyl chloride and phosgene, the latter of which is also a choking agent, have also been used as chlorinating agents. These compounds have the added advantage in that if they are used in excess, they remain as impurities in the finished product and can therefore produce additional mechanisms of toxicity.

Reactions
The idealized combustion of mustard gas in oxygen produces hydrochloric acid and sulfuric acid, in addition to carbon dioxide and water:

Bis(2-chloroethyl)sulfide reacts with sodium hydroxide, giving divinyl sulfide:

Sodium ethoxide acts similarly.

Safety

Upon skin contact or inhalation, bis(2-chloroethyl)sulfide is a nonspecific toxin.  It is a strong alkylating agent, which affects DNA, RNA, and proteins.

See also
Bis(chloromethyl) ether
Half mustard
Nitrogen mustard

References

Thioethers
Organochlorides
Blister agents
World War I chemical weapons
IARC Group 1 carcinogens
Chloroethyl compounds
Sulfur mustards